Albert (Latin Albertus;  – 22 September 1318), called the Fat (pinguis), was duke of Brunswick-Lüneburg.

The second son of Albert the Tall, Duke of Brunswick-Lüneburg, Albert was a boy when his father died in 1279. He was first under guardianship of his uncle, Conrad, Prince-Bishop of Verden, and then of his elder brother, Henry I, Duke of Brunswick-Lüneburg.  In 1286 the three brothers divided their father's Principality of Wolfenbüttel; Albert received the areas around Göttingen, Minden, Northeim, Calenberg, and Hanover. He made Göttingen his residence, thus Principality of Göttingen. In 1292, the third brother, William, died childless, and Albert and Henry, who had received the Principality of Grubenhagen, quarrelled about William's share, the remaining belittled areas around Brunswick and Wolfenbüttel; Albert finally prevailed.

Family
Albert married Rixa, daughter of Henry I, Prince of Werle and Mecklenburg-Güstrow, and Rikissa Birgersdotter from Sweden, in 1284. They had the following children who reached adulthood:
 Adelaide (1290–1311), married John, Landgrave of Lower Hesse
 Richenza, Abbess of Gandersheim(1298-26 April 1317)
 Mechtild (1293–1 June 1356)
 Jutta (1309–1332)
 Otto prince of Wolfenbüttel (24 June 1292 – 30 August 1344)
 Luder, joined the Teutonic Order
 Albert, Bishop of Halberstadt (died 1358)
 Henry, Bishop of Hildesheim (died 1362)
 Magnus I prince of Wolfenbüttel (died 1369)
 Ernest I prince of Gettingen (died 1367)

References
Allgemeine Deutsche Biographie, vol. 1, p. 261-263
At the House of Welf site
Braunschweigisches Biographisches Lexikon, Appelhans 2006, 

|-

Princes of Göttingen
Princes of Wolfenbüttel
Medieval child monarchs
1260s births
1318 deaths
Old House of Brunswick
Burials at Brunswick Cathedral